Emily Anne Theophila, Lady Clive Bayley ( Metcalfe; 1830–1911), was an English memoirist. In 1844, her father sent her an illustrated book which he had commissioned. The book is currently housed in the British Museum. A book of her reminiscences was published in 1980. Edited by M. M. Kaye, it was called The Golden Calm: An English Lady's Life in Moghul Delhi: Reminiscences by Emily, Lady Clive Bayley, and by Her Father Sir Thomas Metcalfe.

Life
Bayley was born Emily Annie Theophila Metcalfe, the daughter of Grace (born Clarke) and Sir Thomas Metcalfe, 4th Baronet, a British civil servant in India known as the British Resident (de facto Ambassador). She was born in India, but raised in England before rejoining her father in Delhi at the age of seventeen. 

Her father had built two houses called Metcalfe House in Delhi and he created a book for her known as the Delhi Book which he had sent to her in 1844 while she was still in England. This remained with her family after her death in 1911 until it was discovered by Lt.-Col. John Mildmay Ricketts M.C. The resulting book was built around the thoughts recorded by Emily's father and illustrated by the paintings he commissioned. This is in the British Museum. To this is added a narrative created by Emily Bayley and then these are then presented by the popular writer M. M. Kaye. in a contemporary book.

In 1850, she married Edward Clive Bayley. He became Knight Commander of the Order of the Star of India in 1877, and Emily became "Lady Clive Bayley". They had a family of one son and seven daughters. One of their daughters, Georgiana was a writer who helped with higher education for women in London.

Bayley collected coins, and sold 75 Indian copper coins to the British Museum in 1889.

References

1830 births
1911 deaths
19th-century English memoirists
19th-century English women writers
19th century in Delhi
Daughters of baronets
Wives of knights
British people in colonial India
Victorian women writers
British women memoirists
19th-century memoirists
English numismatists
Women numismatists